Teatro Grottesco (Italian for Theatre of the Grotesque) is a collection of short stories by American horror author Thomas Ligotti. This is his fifth collection, containing tales written throughout his career. The book was first published in 2006 by Durtro Press as a limited edition hardcover: another hardcover edition was released on November 30, 2007 by Mythos Books, and a paperback edition was released on July 10, 2008 by Virgin Books.

Contents
Derangements
Purity
A boy moves to a new neighborhood with his disturbed family and learns of his father's strange "principles".
The Town Manager
A small town descends into absurd insanity when a new "town manager" arrives.
Sideshow, and Other Stories
A struggling author meets an older, wiser author and reads his strange works.
The Clown Puppet
A man experiences consistent "visits" from a supernatural marionette.
The Red Tower
The narrator tells of the history of a horrific factory.
Deformations
My Case for Retributive Action
A new employee uncovers a strange conspiracy at his office.
Our Temporary Supervisor
In a small factory, a new, uncanny supervisor is sent by corporate.
In a Foreign Town, In a Foreign Land
Various tales are told of the strange town from across the border.
The Damaged and the Diseased
Teatro Grottesco
Various members of the local art community discuss the arrival of the deranged "teatro".
Gas Station Carnivals
An ill man discusses strange memories with an odd acquaintance.
The Bungalow House
A librarian discovers an audiotape art-piece and becomes obsessed with meeting its creator.
Severini
A man with many creative friends is pushed to meet the eccentric Severini.
The Shadow, the Darkness
Many people are brought to the strange town of Crampton for reasons unknown.

Review

—Review by Parlor of Horror

References

2006 short story collections
Horror short story collections
Works by Thomas Ligotti